Carlos Francisco Diassonama Panzo Bunga (born 24 September 1991), known as Chico, is an Angolan professional footballer who plays for Sagrada Esperança as a striker.

In 2018, he signed in for F.C. Bravos do Maquis.

In 2019-20, he signed in for Sagrada Esperança in the Angolan league, the Girabola.

References

External links
 Zerozero profile

1991 births
Living people
Angolan footballers
Association football forwards
Girabola players
Atlético Sport Aviação players
C.R.D. Libolo players
F.C. Bravos do Maquis players
G.D. Interclube players
Progresso Associação do Sambizanga players